Chibia is a town and municipality in the province of Huíla, Angola. The municipality had a population of 190,670 in 2014.

It is served by a station on the southern network of the national railway network.

External links
 Official website

References

Populated places in Huíla Province
Municipalities of Angola